Denbo or Dinbo is a settlement in Lebanon.

Denbo  may also refer to:
Denbo, Pennsylvania
Gary Denbo (born 1960), American former baseball player
Jamie Denbo (born 1973, American actress
Jerry Denbo (1950-2014), American businessman

See also
Deno (disambiguation)